The 2017 Women's Summer Universiade Volleyball Tournament was the 17th edition of the event, organized by the Summer Universiade. It was held in Taipei, Taiwan from 21 to 28 August 2017.

Results 
All times are Taiwan Standard Time (UTC+08:00)

Preliminary round

Group A 

|}

|}

Group B 

|}

|}

Group C 

|}

|}

Group D 

|}

|}

Final round

9th–16th places

9th–16th place quarterfinals 

|}

13th–16th place semifinals 

|}

9th–12th place semifinals 

|}

15th place match 

|}

13th place match 

|}

11th place match 

|}

9th place match 

|}

Final eight

Quarterfinals 

|}

5th–8th place semifinals 

|}

Semifinals 

|}

7th place match 

|}

5th place match 

|}

Third place match 

|}

Final 

|}

Final standing

References

External links
2017 Summer Universiade – Volleyball – Women's tournament

Women
Universiade